Oruj Qeshlaq-e Hajj Esmail (also Romanized as Orūj Qeshlāq-e Ḩājj Esmā‘īl) is a village in Qeshlaq-e Shomali Rural District, in the Central District of Parsabad County, Ardabil Province, Iran. At the 2006 census, its population was 60, in 10 families.

References 

Towns and villages in Parsabad County